VisitScotland, formerly the Scottish Tourist Board, is a national tourism organisation for Scotland. It is an executive non-departmental public body of the Scottish Government, with offices in Edinburgh, Glasgow, Aberdeen, Inverness, and other parts of Scotland.

Among the organisation's tasks is the attraction of visitors to Scotland through advertising and promotional campaigns. VisitScotland also manages a number of quality grading schemes for tourist accommodation and attractions. The organisation also operates the VisitScotland.com website which provides bookings and information service for visitors to Scotland. From 2001 this website was operated as a public-private partnership venture, though this venture (and the website) was brought back into public ownership in 2008.

Aims and operation
VisitScotland's primary aim is to market Scotland as a tourism destination, which it does through advertising and promotion as well as encouraging press articles on Scotland and what it has to offer the business or consumer visitor.

The organisation also seeks to work with the tourism industry in Scotland to maintain standards in visitor attractions and accommodation provision. It does this through a number of specific quality grading schemes. VisitScotland also runs the Thistle Awards, which are awarded to the best tourism businesses each year.

Website
VisitScotland.com is the official website of VisitScotland. The website acts as a bookings and information service for visitors to Scotland. Accommodation availability information, as well as more general information about Scotland, is provided from the www.visitscotland.com domain.

VisitScotland.com was initially the trading name of eTourism Ltd, a private limited company set up by a public-private partnership. In 2003 the IT services group SchlumbergerSema was taken over by Atos. There was a major restructuring in July 2006 that saw VisitScotland increase its stake from 25% to 36%, Austrian booking specialist Tiscover took a 35% share and ATOS reduced its stake from 60% to 7%. Partnerships UK Ltd had also been shareholders.

The ownership of VisitScotland.com became a divisive issue within the Scottish tourism industry. A number of accommodation providers lodged a petition with the Scottish Parliament to return the group to public ownership, arguing that the use of public money to fund the parent company eTourism Ltd was disrupting competition, an assertion which eTourism unconditionally rejected.

In 2008, a Scottish Parliament inquiry led by Tavish Scott considered some problems associated with the website and made the recommendation that the Scottish Government find additional resources to resolve these. On 7 November 2008, it was announced that ownership of VisitScotland.com was to be transferred solely to VisitScotland, with £1.2 million of funds being used to purchase shares from all other shareholders.

See also
Tourism in Scotland
VisitBritain
VisitEngland
Visit Wales

References

Tourism in Scotland
Executive non-departmental public bodies of the Scottish Government
Organisations based in Edinburgh
Economy Directorates
Foreign relations of Scotland
1969 establishments in Scotland
Government agencies established in 1969
Tourism organisations in the United Kingdom
Tourism agencies